Genowefa Minicka (27 June 1926 – 26 April 1992) was a Polish sprinter. She competed in the 200 metres at the 1952 Summer Olympics and the 1956 Summer Olympics.

References

1926 births
1992 deaths
Athletes (track and field) at the 1952 Summer Olympics
Athletes (track and field) at the 1956 Summer Olympics
Polish female sprinters
Polish female long jumpers
Olympic athletes of Poland
Place of birth missing